Football Manager 2007 (also known as Worldwide Soccer Manager 2007 in North America) is a 2006 football management simulation game. Commonly known as FM2007, it is the third game in the Football Manager series overall, following Football Manager 2006. It was developed by Sports Interactive, and published by Sega. FM2007 was released for Windows, Mac, Apple–Intel on 18 October 2006 with Xbox 360 and PlayStation Portable versions following in December 2006. It was succeeded by Football Manager 2008.

Gameplay

As a result of user feedback and continued evolution of the game in general, Sports Interactive introduced over 100 new and revised features to Football Manager 2007. These include:

 A new default GUI, created with the input of user feedback. The new interface is said by SI to be more user-friendly.
 A revamped scouting engine, allowing for more realistic scouting of potential stars. including the ability for scouts to "learn" from their experience. A "scout report card" is also included, in order to provide easier access to important, detailed information about scouting targets.
 Enhanced media interaction, including the ability to make comments on any player in the game world. In previous versions featuring media commentary, managers could only comment on other managers.
 An improved youth team system. The method for generating new players is completely revamped, with the older "regen" system - using recycled statistics from retired players - no longer in use.
 Pre-match team talks. Previously, only half-time and full-time team talks could be given. SI also increased the half-time team talk functionality: managers can now target individual opposition players for special attention, such as instructing players to close them down or always to tackle them with force.
 A hints and tips screen appears when the game is being saved or loading is taking place.
 An option to ask your own team's players what staff (e.g. coaches, physios) or players they would like you to bring to the club has been added.
 Interactions with the board are improved. The board can authorise the building of new stadia. Clubs can be taken over by a group of investors, who may opt to fire the manager (a player may get sacked in the process).
 The manager, as well as NPCs, can comment on referees' decisions, which are not always correct.

The PSP version of the game also included wireless multiplayer for the first time, and was named Football Manager Handheld.

Feeder clubs 

A significant new addition is the ability to create a feeder club affiliation. This allows larger clubs to set up a relationships with a smaller club and vice versa. This can be used by users managing larger clubs to "farm out" players to their feeder club to gain the first team experience that they are unable to get at higher levels. They both work together for mutual benefit. A smaller club can benefit from the ability of these players on loan deals, and can also receive financial help. The larger club may also profit from merchandising in the smaller club's country.

The smaller club may also benefit from lucrative friendly matches against their parent side, as well as getting "first option" on signing players that are to be released by the larger team. American and Chinese teams used as feeder clubs are generally known to be extremely lucrative to a parent club's income through merchandising.

Many fans had requested of SI the inclusion of feeder clubs in recent years, both on the official message boards and elsewhere. Fans of SI claim that the uncommonly close relationship between the design team and the players led to the inclusion of such desired features.

Release

On Saturday, 30 September 2006 a demo of the game was released in four different versions: Strawberry and Vanilla for both Mac and Windows.

The Vanilla demo is basic and only includes English language, and the English league, with no kits, player photos, sound, or graphics.

The Strawberry demo includes playable leagues for Brazil, Denmark, England, Finland, France, Italy, Norway, Portugal, Scotland, Spain and Sweden, many kits and player photos, and language support for many other regions.

Reception

The game received almost universal critical acclaim on release, with an average score of 87 out of 100 on Metacritic. GameSpot described Football Manager 2007 as a "truly immersive football experience", while PC Gamer suggested that "no other game comes close." Football Manager 2007 was also nominated for a Golden Joystick Award and won the Gamers Award at the BAFTA.

Sales
Football Manager 2007s computer version received a "Platinum" sales award from the Entertainment and Leisure Software Publishers Association (ELSPA), indicating sales of at least 300,000 copies in the United Kingdom.

See also
 Championship Manager 2007

References

External links
 

2006 video games
2007
MacOS games
PlayStation Portable games
Video games developed in the United Kingdom
Windows games
Xbox 360 games
BAFTA winners (video games)